Nathan Everett Pearson (1895–1982) was an American ichthyologist. He was a student of Carl H. Eigenmann at Indiana University. He traveled on the Mulford Expedition to the Amazon. He collected 6,000 specimens and discovered 25 new species.

Books
 The fishes of the eastern slope of the Andes 1924 (83 pp.)
 The fishes of the Beni-Mamoré and Paraguay basins 1937
 The fishes of the Atlantic and Pacific slopes near Cajamarca, Peru 1937

References 

1895 births
1982 deaths
American ichthyologists
University of Indianapolis alumni
20th-century American zoologists